Marching Song of the 318th Eng’rs is a song by Dorothy Rich Godfrey from 1918 and was published by the 318th Engineers.

References 

Bibliography
Parker, Bernard S. “World War I Sheet Music: 9,670 Patriotic Songs Published in the United States, 1914-1920, with More Than 600 Covers Illustrated. Jefferson, N.C.: McFarland, 2007.  

American military marches
1918 songs
Songs of World War I